The 2019–20 C.D. Veracruz season was the 76th (and final) season in the football club's history and the 7th consecutive season in the top flight of Mexican football.

Coaching staff

Players

Squad information

Players and squad numbers last updated on 26 July 2019.Note: Flags indicate national team as has been defined under FIFA eligibility rules. Players may hold more than one non-FIFA nationality.

Transfers

In

Out

Competitions

Overview

Torneo Apertura

League table

Results summary

Result round by round

Matches

Statistics

Squad statistics

Goals

Clean sheets

Disciplinary record

References

External links

Mexican football clubs 2019–20 season
C.D. Veracruz seasons